Dakota Mermis (born January 5, 1994) is an American professional ice hockey defenceman currently playing for the Iowa Wild in the American Hockey League (AHL) while under contract to the Minnesota Wild of the National Hockey League (NHL).

Playing career
Undrafted, Mermis originally played in the United States Hockey League with the Lincoln Stars before developing within the USA Hockey National Team Development Program in the 2010–11 season. He left the U.S. Junior program the following season in linking up with the Green Bay Gamblers in his last season in the USHL.

Mermis committed and began his freshman year of college hockey at the University of Denver in the 2012–13 season, before leaving the Pioneers after just 19 games to progress to major junior hockey in the Ontario Hockey League with the London Knights and Oshawa Generals.

Following the conclusion of his major junior career with the Memorial Cup winning Generals after the 2014–15 season, Mermis' unconventional development path was rewarded as he was signed as a free agent to a three-year, entry-level contract with the Arizona Coyotes on July 2, 2015.

In the 2017–18 season, having played in the opening 7 games of the season with AHL affiliate, the Tucson Roadrunners, Mermis received his first recall by the Coyotes on November 1, 2017. With an injury to fellow Coyotes defenseman Niklas Hjalmarsson, Mermis made his NHL debut the following day in a defeat to the Buffalo Sabres.

Having appeared in 10 NHL games with the Coyotes during his four seasons within the organization, Mermis left as a free agent to sign a one-year, two-way $700,000 contract with the New Jersey Devils on July 1, 2019. He initially joined the Binghamton Devils in the AHL to begin the 2019–20 season, leading the blueline in scoring with 19 points through 53 games. Recalled by New Jersey to the NHL, Mermis scored his first career NHL goal against the St. Louis Blues on March 6, 2020. He registered his first multi-point game the following night against the New York Rangers. Mermis appearing in 10 games with the Devils, posting four points, before their season was ended due to the COVID-19 pandemic.

Mermis left the Devils as a free agent after the season and signed to a one-year, two-way contract with the Minnesota Wild on October 9, 2020.

Mermis won the Yanick Dupre Memorial Award while playing for the Iowa Wild in the 2021–22 season.

Career statistics

Regular season and playoffs

International

Awards and honors

References

External links

1994 births
Living people
American men's ice hockey defensemen
Arizona Coyotes players
Binghamton Devils players
Denver Pioneers men's ice hockey players
Green Bay Gamblers players
Ice hockey players from Illinois
Iowa Wild players
Lincoln Stars players
London Knights players
Minnesota Wild players
New Jersey Devils players
Oshawa Generals players
Rapid City Rush players
Springfield Falcons players
Tucson Roadrunners players
Undrafted National Hockey League players
USA Hockey National Team Development Program players